Andrographolide is a labdane diterpenoid that has been isolated from the stem and leaves of Andrographis paniculata. Andrographolide is an extremely bitter substance.

Andrographolide has been studied for its effects on cell signaling, immunomodulation, and stroke.  Study has shown that andrographolide may bind to a spectrum of protein targets including NF-κB and actin by covalent modification.

Biosynthesis
While andrographolide is a relatively simple diterpene lactone, the biosynthesis by Andrographis paniculata was determined in the 2010s. Andrographolide is a member of the isoprenoid family of natural products. The precursors to isoprenoid biosynthesis, isopentenyl pyrophosphate (IPP) and dimethylallyl pyrophosphate (DMAPP), can be synthesized through either the mevalonic acid pathway (MVA) or deoxyxylulose pathway (DXP). Through selective C13 labeling of the precursors to both the MVA and DXP pathways, it was determined that the majority of the andrographolide precursors are synthesized through the DXP pathway. There are a small portion of andrographolide precursors synthesized through the MVA pathway. The biosynthesis of andrographolide begins with the addition of IPP to DMAPP, which forms geranyl pyrophosphate. Another molecule of IPP is then added, yielding farnesyl pyrophosphate (FPP). The final IPP molecule is added to the FPP to complete the backbone of the diterpene. The double bond originating from DMAPP is oxidized to an epoxide prior to the ring closing cascade that forms two six-membered rings. A series of oxidations form a five-membered lactone in addition to adding on the alcohol groups. The order of these post-synthetic modifications is not entirely known.

See also 
 Xiyanping WINDOSE-Tablet

References 

Bitter compounds
Diterpenes
Lactones
Primary alcohols
Secondary alcohols
Decalins